Upscale may refer to:

 Luxury good
 Video scaler